Rhizocarpon is a genus of crustose, saxicolous (or sometimes lichenicolous),  lichens in the family Rhizocarpaceae. The genus is common in arctic-alpine environments, but also occurs throughout temperate, subtropical, and even tropical regions. They are commonly known as map lichens because of the prothallus forming border-like bands between colonies in some species, like the common map lichen (Rhizocarpon geographicum).

Taxonomy and phylogeny
Together with three small genera (Catolechia, Poeltinula and Epilichen), Rhizocarpon constitutes the family Rhizocarpaceae. Historically, ca 389 names have been used. However, many species concepts are ill-defined, many names have been synonymized and new species are regularly being described, so true number of species is not entirely clear as of now, but is estimated to be around 200. In molecular work, the genus has also been shown to be paraphyletic, with closely related genera being nested within Rhizocarpon.

Common traits
With so many species in a morphologically diverse genus it is difficult to say something general about morphology and anatomy and there will inevitably be some exceptions. However, they do share some key traits. They are all crustose and mostly saxicolous (rock-living), with some being lichenicolous (lichen parasites) on other saxicolous lichens. They are all lecideoid, meaning they have apothecia without a thallus margin containing algae.

Ascus and ascospores
The genus has a distinct type of ascus, the Rhizocarpon-type, which is bitunicate with the inner ascus-wall being slightly apically thickened. Ascospores are considered important characters for determining species within the genus. They are either 2-celled (1-septate) or multi-celled (muriform) and are either hyaline or pigmented (green or brown), often with a characteristic halo (or “perispore”) visible when viewed in a microscope. Asci contain eight, two or rarely one spore.

Species
, Species Fungorum (in the Catalogue of Life) accepts 75 species of Rhizopogon.

Rhizocarpon advenulum 
Rhizocarpon alpicola 
Rhizocarpon amphibium 
Rhizocarpon anaperum 
Rhizocarpon austroalpinum  – Australia
Rhizocarpon austroamphibium  – Australia
Rhizocarpon badioatrum 
Rhizocarpon bicolor  – Australia
Rhizocarpon caeruleoalbum 
Rhizocarpon caesium  – Europe
Rhizocarpon chioneum 
Rhizocarpon cinereonigrum 
Rhizocarpon cinereovirens 
Rhizocarpon clausum 
Rhizocarpon cleptophilum  – Greenland
Rhizocarpon copelandii 
Rhizocarpon dahlii 
Rhizocarpon dimelaenae 
Rhizocarpon diploschistinum 
Rhizocarpon disporum 
Rhizocarpon distinctum 
Rhizocarpon eupetraeoides 
Rhizocarpon exiguum  – Australia
Rhizocarpon expallescens 
Rhizocarpon ferax 
Rhizocarpon flavomedullosum  – Australia
Rhizocarpon furfurosum 
Rhizocarpon geminatum 
Rhizocarpon geographicum 
Rhizocarpon grande 
Rhizocarpon haidense 
Rhizocarpon hochstetteri 
Rhizocarpon inarense 
Rhizocarpon infernulum 
Rhizocarpon intermediellum 
Rhizocarpon jemtlandicum 
Rhizocarpon johnstonii 
Rhizocarpon kerguelense 
Rhizocarpon lavatum 
Rhizocarpon lecanorinum 
Rhizocarpon lusitanicum 
Rhizocarpon malvinae  – Falkland Islands
Rhizocarpon mawsonii 
Rhizocarpon ochrolechiae 
Rhizocarpon oederi 
Rhizocarpon oxydatum  – New Zealand
Rhizocarpon pallidum 
Rhizocarpon petraeum 
Rhizocarpon polycarpum 
Rhizocarpon postumum 
Rhizocarpon purpurascens  – New Zealand
Rhizocarpon quinonum  – Alaska
Rhizocarpon reductum 
Rhizocarpon richardii 
Rhizocarpon ridescens 
Rhizocarpon roridulum 
Rhizocarpon saurinum 
Rhizocarpon simillimum 
Rhizocarpon sipmanianum 
Rhizocarpon smaragdulum  – Siberia
Rhizocarpon subareolatum  – Greenland
Rhizocarpon subgeminatum 
Rhizocarpon sublavatum  – Europe
Rhizocarpon submodestum 
Rhizocarpon subpostumum 
Rhizocarpon sulphurosum 
Rhizocarpon sunchonense  – South Korea
Rhizocarpon superficiale 
Rhizocarpon tephromelae 
Rhizocarpon timdalii  – Europe; North America
Rhizocarpon tinei 
Rhizocarpon torquatum /
Rhizocarpon transiens 
Rhizocarpon tungurahuae 
Rhizocarpon umbilicatum 
Rhizocarpon umense 
Rhizocarpon vigilans  – Australia
Rhizocarpon viridiatrum 
Rhizocarpon vulcani  – Japan

Gallery

References

Rhizocarpaceae
Lichen genera
Lecanoromycetes genera
Taxa named by Augustin Pyramus de Candolle